Punggol Point Park, formerly known as Punggol Point, is located in Punggol, north-east of Singapore.

History
Punggol Beach was one of the sites where Chinese civilians were killed during the Sook Ching Massacre. 

The location has now been declared as a national heritage site. There is a plaque commemorating the Sook Ching Massacre. The inscription on the plaque reads:

The remains of some victims from the Sook Ching massacre would later be discovered by beach goers and fishermen. In 13 March 1977, a human skull and some bones was brought to light when a man dug a hole in the sand around the area. In December 1997, a man digging for earthworms as bait found a skull with two gold teeth as well as parts of an arm and a leg near the shore.

Present

A jetty known as Punggol Point Jetty had been an iconic part of Punggol Point and it has been there for a very long time. Punggol Point was also a home to a cluster of popular seafood restaurants in the 1980s and the 1990s.

The area, including the jetty that is situated there, underwent development and reopened as Punggol Point Park on 20 November 2011.

Getting there
The place can be reached from Punggol Road. After its redevelopment into Punggol Point Park, a new road named Punggol Point Road leads into a public carpark for visitors. By public transport, it is a walking distance away from Punggol Point LRT station. It is also accessible by taking bus service 84 from Punggol Temporary Interchange at Punggol Town Centre.

See also
Changi Beach Park
Belakang Mati Beach
Sook Ching

References

Punggol
Places in Singapore
Parks in Singapore